Biatorella is a genus of fungi belonging to the family Biatorellaceae. The genus has a cosmopolitan distribution.

Species 
The genus Biatorella includes the following species:

 Biatorella algerica 
 Biatorella algoviae 
 Biatorella amabilis 
 Biatorella antarctica
 Biatorella australica
 Biatorella austroafrica
 Biatorella camptocarpa
 Biatorella consanguinea
 Biatorella conspurcans
 Biatorella contigua
 Biatorella cyphalea
 Biatorella floridensis
 Biatorella fossarum
 Biatorella germanica
 Biatorella hemisphaerica
 Biatorella praenotata
 Biatorella rappii
 Biatorella rousselii
 Biatorella saxicola
 Biatorella zeorina

References 

Fungi
Lichen genera
Taxa named by Giuseppe De Notaris
Taxa described in 1846